Tibbetts Brook is a stream in Mille Lacs County, in the U.S. state of Minnesota.

Tibbetts Brook was named for two brothers who worked in the lumber industry.

See also
List of rivers of Minnesota

References

Rivers of Mille Lacs County, Minnesota
Rivers of Minnesota